This is an alphabetical list of the songs known to have been recorded or performed by the South Korean girl group Secret.

0–9

A

B

C

D

E

F

G

H

I

J

L

M

N

O

P

R

S

T

U

V

W

Y

Other songs

See also
Secret discography
Secret videography
List of awards and nominations received by Secret

References

External links
Official Japanese website by SonyMusic 
Official Korean website by TS Entertainment 

Secret (South Korean band)
Secret (South Korean band) songs
Secret